Marlene Strathe was the Provost at Oklahoma State University, Oklahoma, United States until July 2010.  She served as interim president of the university in 2007 before current president V. Burns Hargis was elected.
She formerly served as the Provost and Vice President for Academic Affairs at the University of Northern Colorado where she was also a Professor of Applied Statistics and Research Methodology.

References 

Oklahoma State University faculty
Year of birth missing (living people)
Living people